Organista may refer to:
Viola organista, a musical instrument designed by Leonardo da Vinci
Alejandro Organista (born 2000), Mexican footballer
Carlos Manuel Villalobos Organista (born 1951), Mexican politician
José Miguel Organista (born 1981), Portuguese footballer
Sérgio Organista (born 1984), Portuguese footballer

Portuguese-language surnames
Spanish-language surnames